Bierzgłowo  (German: Birgelau) is a village in the administrative district of Gmina Łubianka, within Toruń County, Kuyavian-Pomeranian Voivodeship, in north-central Poland.

Birgelau was the seat of a Komtur of the Teutonic Knights. A castle was erected in 1232 and expanded until 1305.

The village has a population of 200.

References

Villages in Toruń County
Castles of the Teutonic Knights